Jacquie Fenske (born 1955 or 1956) is a Canadian politician, who served as interim leader of the Alberta Party from 2020 to 2021. She served on Strathcona County Council from 1995 to 1998, and again from 2004 to 2012. Fenske then went into provincial politics as a Progressive Conservative, representing the riding of Fort Saskatchewan-Vegreville from 2012 to 2015. In the 2015 provincial election, the seat was won by NDP candidate, Jessica Littlewood.

Political career
Jacquie Fenske successfully ran for county councillor, in the new Ward 5, in 1995. After a six-year hiatus she became councillor again for the ward in 2004. Fenske was acclaimed in 2007, and 2010. She unsuccessfully ran for the Conservative Party of Canada nomination for Edmonton—Sherwood Park, prior to the 2008 federal election; Tim Uppal was nominated and won.

On April 23, 2012, with Fort Saskatchewan-Vegreville MLA and former Premier Ed Stelmach retiring, Fenske won the Fort Saskatchewan-Vegreville riding for the Progressive Conservative (PC) Party.

In the 2017 municipal elections, Fenske ran in the Mayoral race for Strathcona County.  She lost, coming in third with 15.4% of the vote.

Fenske later joined the Alberta Party, and on February 10, 2020 she became the Interim leader of the Alberta Party.

References

Alberta municipal councillors
1950s births
Women municipal councillors in Canada
Progressive Conservative Association of Alberta MLAs
University of Alberta alumni
Women MLAs in Alberta
Living people
21st-century Canadian politicians
21st-century Canadian women politicians
Leaders of the Alberta Party